Neogalerucella is a genus of purple loosestrife beetles in the family Chrysomelidae. There are at least four described species in Neogalerucella.

Species
These four species belong to the genus Neogalerucella:
 Neogalerucella calmariensis (Linnaeus, 1767) (black-margined loosestrife beetle)
 Neogalerucella pusilla (Duftschmid, 1825)
 Neogalerucella quebecensis (Brown, 1938)
 Neogalerucella stefanssoni (Brown, 1938)

References

Galerucinae
Chrysomelidae genera